The WD TV is a consumer device that was produced by Western Digital which plays videos, images, and music from USB drives or network locations. The device was introduced in 2008 and played high-definition video through an HDMI port, and standard video through composite video cables. The device had support for most common video and audio formats. The WD TV was discontinued as of August 2016.

Models

WD TV (1st Gen)
In November 2008 Western Digital introduced the WD TV. with full HD 1080p multimedia player with DTS pass-through only. The hardware starts with a 300 MHz TangoX MIPS 4KEc from Sigma Designs, which has 100 MB of memory.

WD TV (2nd Gen)
Updated device with 2-channel DTS support. Uses the same Sigma SMP8655 Secure Media Processor as the Live.

WD TV Mini
Released in Fall 2009, it was a Media Player with DVD quality, upscales to 1080i, Plays back RealVideo and many other popular file formats with no need for transcoding, but lacks the ability to play H.264 encoded video. It is the only WD TV device without HDMI, providing only analog video output.

WD TV Live
Released in Fall 2009 with Full HD 1080p resolution. An updated device with 2-channel DTS, streaming and network support, which comes in the form of an Ethernet port on the back. Also compatible with certain wireless USB adapters. Connects to Internet sites: YouTube (until 2017), Flickr, Live365, myTV, Pandora, Mediafly, Flingo, AccuWeather, Facebook or stream content from a home network. Supports a wide variety of the most popular file formats. No need for transcoding. Mediafly and DVD menu support added in firmware update.

The device supports three playlist formats.

The Sigma Designs SMP8655 SoC inside the WD TV Live features a 500 MHz CPU, a 333 MHz coprocessor, a 333 MHz DSP, 512 MB of DRAM, and 256 MB of NAND flash memory. Western Digital has tweaked the original Sigma SMP8600 Family design slightly by including 6 video Digital to Analog Converters (DACs) which should give it the ability to handle high-def content with ease. (Model number WDBAAN0000NBK).

WD TV Live Plus (WD TV Live 2nd Gen)
Released early in 2010 and having all the features of the WD TV Live along with Netflix streaming support. In order to support Netflix, a macrovision enabled SoC was required (Sigma Designs SMP8654) and the Linux system is also now encrypted.  However, actual user experience has lagged for some. As of April 12, 2011, Netflix Canada works on a WD Live TV Plus as long as the firmware has been upgraded to version 1.04.31_B or newer. It is also known as WDTV Live Plus (Model number WDBABX0000NBK, WDBREC0000NBK, WDBG3A0000NBK).

Reviews: WD TV Live Plus was met with generally positive reviews. Review Horizon names it a worthy successor of WD TV Live.

WD TV Live Hub
Released in fall 2010, this is a WD TV Live device with an internal 1 TB storage disk. It uses the same Sigma Designs SMP8654 found in the WD TV Live Plus with four 64 MB Nanya NT5TU64M16GG DDR2 667/800 MHz modules (256 MB total), and a 2 GB Samsung K9F2G080UB flash chip.

WD TV Live Streaming (WD TV Live 3rd Gen)
Released in October 2011. It has customizable themes, a larger remote control, can get content information from the internet, plays DRM-protected services, has a built-in wireless adapter, a 10/100Mbit/s RJ45 Ethernet port and is the first WD TV model to include the Spotify service. The WD TV Live has  WiFi and a Sigma Designs SMP8670AD 700 MHz processor with 512MB of DDR2 memory from Nanya. It is also known as WD TV Live Gen 3 (NTSC model number WDBHG70000NBK, PAL model number WDBGXT0000NBK).

WD TV Play (WD TV 4th Gen)
According to the WD Site, it was released in early 2013.  (NTSC model number WDBMBA0000NBK). Their exact words are:

The software does not support DTS or MPEG2, as these features were removed.

WD TV Media Player (WD TV 2nd Gen)
Released in July 2014. (NTSC model number WDBYMN0000NBK, PAL model number WDBPUF0000NBK). Identical hardware to the WDTV Live Streaming but missing Netflix. This last version of the WDTV was finally discontinued by Western digital in June 2016 and is no longer available for sale through the manufacturer.

Hacking
The WD TV has been hacked to enable further options, including using external optical drives, Ethernet connection via USB to Ethernet adapters, bittorrent downloading and improved thumbnail preview images. The newest versions of the WD TV (Streaming Media) have encrypted firmware and there are efforts to continue hacking them.

See also 
 Comparison of set-top boxes

References

External links

Linux-based devices
Western Digital products